Percy is a 1925 American silent comedy film directed by Roy William Neill and starring Charles Ray, Louise Dresser and Victor McLaglen. The film is based upon the novel The Desert Fiddler by William Henry Hamby.

Plot
As described in a film magazine review, Percy Rogeen, a mother’s boy, becomes his dad’s campaign manager and is taught to drink and smoke. In a fight he is thrown into a box car and eventually lands in the desert. He is saved from a gang by Holy Joe. Together they go to a gambling house and save the girl’s property from a gang plotting to get hold of it through holding back the water.

Cast

Preservation
With no prints of Percy located in any film archives, it is a lost film.

References

Bibliography
 Goble, Alan. The Complete Index to Literary Sources in Film. Walter de Gruyter, 1999.

External links

Lantern slide and still at silenthollywood.com

1925 films
1925 comedy films
Silent American comedy films
American silent feature films
1920s English-language films
Films directed by Roy William Neill
Pathé Exchange films
American black-and-white films
1920s American films